Cyclophyllum multiflorum is a small tree in the family Rubiaceae reaching  in height. It is endemic to Queensland and occurs from around Rossville (near Cooktown), south to around 
Mount Elliot (near Townsville).

References

External links
 
 
 View a map of historical sightings of this species at the Australasian Virtual Herbarium
 View observations of this species on iNaturalist
 View images of this species on Flickriver

multiflorum
Endemic flora of Queensland
Taxa named by Sally T. Reynolds
Taxa named by Rodney John Francis Henderson
Plants described in 2001